Świerczewo is a municipal neighborhood of the city of Poznań, Poland.

Neighbourhoods of Poznań